Tom Godwin (June 6, 1915 – August 31, 1980) was an American science fiction author active throughout the 1950s into the 1970s. In his career, Godwin published three novels and around thirty short stories. He is best known for his short story, "The Cold Equations". Published in 1954, the short story was Godwin’s fourth work to be published and was one whose controversial dark ending helped redefine the genre.

Early life and education

Godwin was born in Maryland in 1915. He had a rough childhood that was marked by much loss and suffering. At the age of five, his younger sister died as a result of an accidental shooting that occurred after he had been "playing with the gun that killed her". After his mother's death, he was raised by his father, with whom he did not have the best relationship. He withdrew from school after the third grade, but he went on to teach himself multiple other subjects to expand his knowledge and be able to write better stories.

Personal life
Godwin had a spinal disorder known as kyphosis, which results in a curvature of the spine, making him appear hunchbacked. He spent a few months in the Army before he was discharged due to his spinal condition worsening.

In the early 1960s, Godwin was living in a remote area of northwestern Arizona with his father writing and making his own drywashers to sell. It was in the summer of 1961 that he met his future wife, Laureola Godwin, and his then twelve-year-old step-daughter, whom he later adopted, Diane Godwin Sullivan, through the sale of one of his drywashers. He went on to base two of the main characters in his second novel, The Space Barbarians, after them.

He worked for the forest service in Washington state for a short period of time. His wife died from a heart attack in the early 1970s. This was something that had a heavy impact on him for the rest of his life. After living with his adopted daughter and her family in Texas for some time after his wife's death, he moved to Nevada.

Death

Throughout his life, Godwin battled with alcohol abuse with varying degrees of success in being able to control it. It was his wife's death that eventually led him to be "consume[d]" by drinking which led to many health problems. Godwin died in a Las Vegas hospital in the summer of 1980. He did not have any identification on him so his body was held at a funeral home until a friend of his who was a physician assistant learned of his death and contacted his daughter, Diane.

Works

Novels
Ragnarok series:
The Survivors (Gnome Press, 1958; also known as Space Prison, Pyramid Books, 1960)
The Space Barbarians (Pyramid Books, 1964)

Others:
Beyond Another Sun (Curtis, 1971)

Short stories

 "The Gulf Between" in Astounding, October 1953
 "Mother of Invention" in Astounding, December 1953
 "The Greater Thing" in Astounding, February 1954
 "The Cold Equations" in Astounding, August 1954
 "No Species Alone" in Universe, November 1954
 "You Created Us" in Fantastic Universe, October 1955
 "The Barbarians" in If, December 1955
 "Operation Opera" in Fantasy and Science Fiction, April 1956
 "Brain Teaser" in If, October 1956
 "Too Soon to Die" (basis for his novel The Survivors) in Venture, March 1957
 "The Harvest" in Venture, July 1957
 "The Last Victory" in If, August 1957
 "The Nothing Equation" in Amazing, December 1957
 "The Wild Ones" in Science Fiction Stories, January 1958
 "My Brother - The Ape" in Amazing, January 1958
 "Cry From a Far Planet" in Amazing, September 1958
 "A Place Beyond the Stars" in Super-Science Fiction, February 1959
 "Empathy" in Fantastic, October 1959
 "The Helpful Hand of God" in Analog, December 1961
 "...and Devious the Line of Duty" in Analog, December 1962
 "Desert Execution" in The Man from U.N.C.L.E. Magazine, July 1967
 "The Gentle Captive" in the original story anthology Signs and Wonders (1972)
 "She Was a Child" in Mike Shayne Mystery Magazine, April 1973
 "We'll Walk Again in the Moonlight" in the anthology Crisis (1974)
 "Backfire" in Ed McBain's 87th Precinct Mystery Magazine, April 1975
 "The Steel Guardian" in Antaeus, Spring/Summer 1977
 "Social Blunder" in Amazing, July 1977
 "Before Willows Ever Walked" in Fantasy and Science Fiction, March 1980

Collections
The following stories are collected in the book, The Cold Equations & Other Stories ed. Eric Flint (Baen Books, 2004):
 "The Survivors" • novel
 "The Harvest" • short story
 "Brain Teaser" • short story
 "Mother of Invention" • novella
 "...and Devious the Line of Duty" • novelette
 "Empathy" • novelette
 "No Species Alone" • novelette
 "The Gulf Between" • novella
 "The Cold Equations" • novelette

References

Citations

Bibliography

External links
 
 
 
 

20th-century American novelists
American male novelists
American science fiction writers
1915 births
1980 deaths
American male short story writers
20th-century American short story writers
20th-century American male writers